The 2009 Grey Power World Cup of Curling was held October 21-25 at the Hershey Centre in Mississauga, Ontario.

The 2009 World Cup was the first Grand Slam event of the 2009-10 curling season. It was the first Grand Slam to be held in the Greater Toronto Area. 

Previously, this event was known as the Masters of Curling, but in 2009 it was changed to the World Cup of Curling . The 2009 event will have a majority of its teams from outside of Canada. The event will feature one team from every country that will send a team to the men's Olympic event, except Canada, which will have five teams (the four teams that have already qualified for the 2009 Canadian Olympic Curling Trials plus defending Olympic champions, team Brad Gushue.   

The total purse of the event was $100,000, with the Howard rink winning $24,000 of that.

For the third event in a row, Howard faced off against Koe in the final. Howard defended his previous three titles by winning his fourth straight event, and his eighth Grand Slam title. Koe has yet to win a title, having now lost six Grand Slam finals.

Three Nations Cup
In addition to the World Cup, which is a men's event, a women's "Three Nations Cup" was held. This small event featured teams Shannon Kleibrink and Stefanie Lawton of Canada as well as Wang Bingyu of China and Eve Muirhead of Great Britain.  Many of the top women's teams however could not participate, as they were playing in the 2009 Manitoba Lotteries Women's Curling Classic. The event was a round robin event, which was won by Great Britain's Eve Muirhead.

World Cup teams

Draw

Pool A

Scores:
Martin 9-1 Edin 
Ferbey 4-2 Wang
Koe 7-4 Dufour
Martin 6-3 Dufour
Ulsrud 8-2 Edin
Koe 6-4 Ulsrud 
Edin 8-3 Ferbey  
Martin 8-4 Wang
Wang 8-5 Dufour
Koe 7-6 Ferbey (9)
Edin 5-3 Dufour
Martin 5-4 Ulsrud (9)
Koe 6-4 Wang
Ulsrud 7-4 Ferbey
Martin 9-5 Koe
Ferbey 6-4 Dufour
Edin 5-4 Wang (9)
Ulsrud 6-3 Dufour
Martin 6-3 Ferbey 
Ulsrud 4-2 Wang
Edin 8-6 Koe

Pool B

Scores:
Howard 9-5 Kapp
Shuster 4-3 Gushue
Kapp 7-1 Gushue
Stöckli 8-4 Murdoch
Howard 9-3 Schmidt
Kapp 8-0 Shuster
Gushue 6-5 Stöckli (9)
Schmidt 5-3 Shuster
Howard 8-3 Murdoch
Howard 4-1 Gushue
Stöckli 4-1 Kapp
Schmidt 8-3 Murdoch
Schmidt 6-5 Kapp (9)
Shuster 5-4 Stöckli 
Gushue 6-2 Murdoch
Howard 6-5 Shuster (9)
Howard 8-5 Stöckli
Kapp 4-3 Murdoch
Gushue 9-4 Schmidt
Schmidt 8-5 Stöckli
Murdoch 5-4 Shuster

Playoffs

External links
Event website
World Curling Tour event site

Masters (curling)
Sport in Mississauga
Curling in Ontario
2009 in Canadian curling
2009 in Ontario